Shweta Munshi is an Indian television actress. She made her debut as a lead actress in TV series “Kyunki Jeena Isse Ka Naam Hai” which was aired on Doordarshan. She became popular for her role as the protagonist Avani Patil in Maayke Se Bandhi Dor, which was aired Prime time on Star Plus. She portrayed the role of Arpita in the most famous Zee TV show, Punar Vivah. She made a brief appearance in Zee TV show Bandhan  as Aditya Redij’s wife Prabha.

Early life 
Shweta Munshi was born in M.P, at indore completed her high school education and did her Engineering degree in computer science from Indore. During her graduation she started learning Bharatnatyam, and doing theatre.
She later moved to Mumbai in 2006 and joined Roshan Taneja School of Acting for a Diploma course.

Career 
Shweta Munshi began her acting career professionally in 2008, with a show that was aired on Doordarshan 'Kyunki Jeena Issi Ka Naam Hai'. She then appeared on the TV show - 'Maayke Se Bandhi Dor' on Star Plus. She played a special cameo in Zee TV's popular show 'Punar Vivah' .Also was seen in episodic series in ' Fear Files'. She briefly appeared in Zee TV's show 'Bandhan' as Prabha Karnik.
Currently, Shweta is seen in many Brand Advertisements & Tv Commercials, as Samsung Bixby, Horlicks, Vim bar, Amazon grocery, etc.

References

External links 
 

Indian television actresses